The Hikuwai River is the name for the middle section of the Ūawa River in the Gisborne Region of New Zealand. The Hikuwai river section ends at the confluence with the Mangatokerau River  before the Ūawa River into the sea at Tolaga Bay.

In March 2022, heavy rainfall in the region caused the river to rise by over 9.6 metres, causing the nearby town of Mangatuna to be evacuated.

See also
List of rivers of New Zealand

References

Rivers of the Gisborne District
Rivers of New Zealand